K. A. Mani is an Indian politician and former member of the Tamil Nadu Legislative Assembly. He was elected to the Tamil Nadu legislative assembly as an Anna Dravida Munnetra Kazhagam candidate from Kabilarmalai constituency. He is a native of Koodacheri village, near Paramathi-Velur.

References 

Members of the Tamil Nadu Legislative Assembly
Living people
Year of birth missing (living people)